is a Japanese professional wrestler who is currently signed to Pro Wrestling Noah (Noah). He previously wrestled in WWE, where he performed on the NXT brand under the ring name Hachiman as a member of Diamond Mine, and also worked as a coach at the WWE Performance Center.

Trained by Billy Robinson, Suzuki started his career with the Inoki Genome Federation (IGF) promotion in 2008. In 2014, he left IGF to become a freelancer, starting to work for promotions such as Big Japan Pro Wrestling (BJW), Pro Wrestling Zero1 (Zero1) and Wrestle-1 (W-1). He is a former two-time BJW World Strong Heavyweight Champion,a former one-time Zero1 World Heavyweight, NWA United National Heavyweight, Wrestle-1 Champion and NWA Intercontinental Tag Team Champion. In 2017, Fighting TV Samurai named Suzuki the MVP in Japanese independent wrestling. Overall, Suzuki is recognized as a 3-time world champion.

Professional wrestling career

Inoki Genome Federation (2008–2014)
With a background in judo and football, Suzuki was trained in professional wrestling at the U.W.F. Snake Pit Japan dojo. After four years of training under British wrestler Billy Robinson, he made his debut for the Inoki Genome Federation (IGF) promotion on November 24, 2008, losing to Hiromitsu Kanehara. For the next three years, Suzuki worked undercards of IGF events. His status finally began to rise in 2012 following a match with Peter Aerts. On May 26, 2013, Suzuki won the second Inoki Genome tournament, defeating Akira Joh in the finals. As a result, he received his first shot at the IGF Championship on October 26, but was defeated by the defending champion, Kazuyuki Fujita. The following March, Suzuki left IGF to become a freelancer.

Freelance (2014–2021)
Suzuki then began working regularly for Pro Wrestling Zero1 (Zero1), while also making appearances for promotions such as All Japan Pro Wrestling (AJPW), DDT Pro-Wrestling (DDT), and Pro Wrestling Noah (Noah). Suzuki quickly received a shot at Zero1's World Heavyweight Championship, though losing to defending champion, Kohei Sato, on May 6. On August 3, 2014, Suzuki finally won his first professional wrestling championship in Zero1, defeating Tama Williams for the NWA United National Heavyweight Championship. In November, Suzuki took part in special week, where Zero1 co-produced three events with the Wrestle-1 promotion.

Through the continued relationship between Zero1 and Wrestle-1, Suzuki began also making appearances for the latter promotion, where he found himself a rival in Kai. On March 8, 2015, after Kai had captured the Wrestle-1 Championship, Suzuki immediately confronted the new champion and challenged him to a title match. The match took place on April 1 and saw Suzuki defeat Kai in just seven minutes to become the new Wrestle-1 Champion. On May 5, Suzuki put both of his championships on the line at separate Zero1 and Wrestle-1 shows, losing the NWA United National Heavyweight Championship to Kamikaze and retaining the Wrestle-1 Championship against Ryota Hama. On June 27, Suzuki returned to IGF for the first time since his departure from the promotion, first defeating Wang Bin in the opening round and then Daichi Hashimoto in the finals to win the Genome-1 2015 Nagoya tournament. Following the win, Suzuki formed an "anti-IGF" stable with foreigners Erik Hammer, Kevin Kross and Knux. On July 12, Suzuki lost the Wrestle-1 Championship back to Kai in his third defense. On November 1, Suzuki defeated Kohei Sato to win Pro Wrestling Zero1's World Heavyweight Championship. On February 26, 2016, Suzuki returned to IGF, when he was appointed the leader of a new stable named Hagure IGF Gundan ("Rogue IGF Corps"), which also included Kazuyuki Fujita, Kendo Kashin and Shogun Okamoto. On March 27, Suzuki lost the World Heavyweight Championship to Kohei Sato.

On March 5, 2017, Suzuki challenged Daisuke Sekimoto for the Big Japan Pro Wrestling (BJW) World Strong Heavyweight Championship. After wrestling to a thirty-minute time limit draw, Suzuki and Sekimoto agreed to a rematch on March 30. Suzuki went on to win the rematch to become the new World Strong Heavyweight Champion. On September 14, Suzuki and Kohei Sato defeated Shogun Okamoto and Yutaka Yoshie to win the vacant NWA Intercontinental Tag Team Championship. After five successful title defenses, Suzuki lost the BJW World Strong Heavyweight Championship to Daichi Hashimoto on December 17. Suzuki claimed that losing the title cost him most of his bookings and that he was facing unemployment heading into 2018. On January 1, 2018, Suzuki and Sato lost the NWA Intercontinental Tag Team Championship to Masayuki Okamoto and Yutaka Yoshie.

On April 4, 2019 at Josh Barnett's Bloodsport, Suzuki defeated Timothy Thatcher via knockout.

WWE (2021–2022) 
In April 2021, Suzuki signed with WWE as a coach in the Performance Center. Despite his work as coach, Suzuki would begin to work on NXT's weekly show as a pro wrestler under the name of Hachiman, as a part of the villainous stable Diamond Mine, alongside Roderick Strong, Tyler Rust (who was released several weeks later) and Malcolm Bivens. Within the coming months, The Creed Brothers (Brutus and Julius Creed) and Ivy Nile would also join the stable. On January 5, 2022, Suzuki was released from his WWE contract.

Pro Wrestling Noah (2022–current) 
On February 24, 2022 it was announced that Suzuki would be returning to Japan to wrestle for Pro Wrestling Noah (Noah). On March 13, 2022 Suzuki would team with Takashi Sugiura to win the GHC Tag Team Championship by defeating the team of Daiki Inaba & Kaito Kiyomiya at Noah Great Voyage In Yokohama 2022

Other media
Suzuki's first book, entitled , was released on January 19, 2017. The book is about wrestling techniques taught to Suzuki by Billy Robinson.

Championships and accomplishments

Big Japan Pro Wrestling
BJW World Strong Heavyweight Championship (2 times)
Yokohama Shopping Street 6-Man Tag Team Championship (1 time) – with Takuya Nomura and Yoshihisa Uto
Ikkitousen Strong Climb (2018)
Ice Ribbon
Triangle Ribbon Championship (1 time)
Inoki Genome Federation
2nd Inoki Genome Tournament (2013)
Genome-1 2015 Nagoya
Japan Indie Awards
MVP Award (2017)
Pro-Wrestling Basara
Shinjuku Chijō Saidai Budōkai Tournament (2017)
Pro Wrestling Illustrated
Ranked No. 122 of the top 500 singles wrestlers in the PWI 500 in 2018
Pro Wrestling Noah
GHC Tag Team Championship (2 times) – with Takashi Sugiura (1) and Timothy Thatcher (1)
Pro Wrestling Zero1
NWA Intercontinental Tag Team Championship (1 time) – with Kohei Sato
NWA United National Heavyweight Championship (1 time)
World Heavyweight Championship (1 time)
Tokyo Sports
Technique Award (2017)
Toshikoshi Puroresu
Shuffle Tag Tournament (2017) – with Konosuke Takeshita
Wrestle-1
Wrestle-1 Championship (1 time)

References

External links
Inoki Genome Federation profile  
U.W.F. Snake Pit profile  
Puroresu Central profile
 

1980 births
Living people
Japanese male professional wrestlers
Sportspeople from Hokkaido
Japanese male judoka
GHC Tag Team Champions
Wrestle-1 Champions
21st-century professional wrestlers
BJW World Strong Heavyweight Champions
Yokohama Shopping Street 6-Man Tag Team Champions